This is a list of castles and manor houses in the German city-state of Hamburg. The list encompasses castles referred to in German as Burg (castle or fortification), Schloss (manor house, castle or palace), and Herrenhaus (manor house or mansion); existing, ruined or completely vanished.

The oldest known structures in Hamburg are or were early Medieval fortifications built between the 8th and 11th centuries, e.g. Hammaburg, Bischofsturm, Domburg, Alsterburg and Neue Burg. They were all purpose-built and are located in Hamburg's Altstadt (old town). Remains of the Bischofsturm (Bishop's tower) can be visited in close vicinity of St. Petrikirche.

Later buildings were rarely fortifications. From the 13th century onwards, Hamburg had a complete ring of defensive structures, and as one of Europe's oldest city-republics there were no royal or princely estates (notable exceptions are structures in the boroughs of Bergedorf and Harburg which date from a time prior to becoming part of Hamburg). In the 17th through 19th century wealthy grand burghers had their country estates built as mansions or manor houses in the former outskirts, notably along Elbe and Elbchaussee in Othmarschen, Nienstedten and Blankenese, but also along Alster and the Alster Valley.

<li> Construction date or first mentioned on record.
<li> Borough or quarter of current political location.

Bibliographie 

 Rainer-Maria Weiss, Anne Klammt (eds.): Mythos Hammaburg. Archäologische Entdeckungen zu den Anfängen Hamburgs. Hamburg 2014, ISBN 978-3-931429-27-0.
 Rainer-Maria Weiss (ed.).Burgen in Hamburg: Eine Spurensuche Wachholz, Kiel 2021, ISBN 978-3-529-05070-1
 Thorsten Lemm: Die frühmittelalterlichen Ringwälle im westlichen und mittleren Holstein. Wachholtz Verlag, Neumünster/Hamburg 2013, ISBN 978-3-529-01806-0.

See also 
List of castles in Germany
List of churches in Hamburg

References

External links 

 
Castles
Hamburg